The Roman Catholic Diocese of Huaraz is a diocese of the Latin Church of the Roman Catholic Church in Peru. Erected in 1899, the diocese is a suffragan of the Archdiocese of Trujillo

The current bishop is José Eduardo Velásquez Tarazona, appointed in Feb. 2004.

History
On 15 May 1899 Pope Leo XIII established the Diocese of Huaraz with territory taken from the Archdiocese of Lima.  It lost territory when the Territorial Prelature of Huarí was established in 1958.

Bishops

Ordinaries
Ezechiel Francisco Soto, SS.CC. † (27 Feb 1901 – 17 Apr 1903)
Mariano Holguin, O.F.M. † (12 Aug 1904 – 1 Jun 1906) Appointed, Bishop of Arequipa
Pedro Pascual Francesco Farfán † (6 Aug 1907 – 19 Apr 1918) Appointed, Bishop of Cuzco
Domingo Juan Vargas, O.P. † (26 Aug 1920 – 1 Aug 1936)
Mariano Jacinto Valdivia y Ortiz † (15 Dec 1940 – 17 Dec 1956) Appointed, Bishop of Huancayo
Teodosio Moreno Quintana † (17 Dec 1956 – 21 Sep 1971)
Fernando Vargas Ruiz de Somocurcio, S.J. † (21 Sep 1971 – 18 Jan 1978) Appointed, Archbishop of Piura
Emilio Vallebuona Merea, S.D.B. † (18 Jan 1978 – 30 Aug 1985) Appointed, Archbishop of Huancayo
José Ramón Gurruchaga Ezama, S.D.B. † (3 Jan 1987 – 14 Dec 1996) Appointed, Bishop of Lurín
Ivo Baldi Gaburri † (14 Dec 1999 – 4 Feb 2004) Appointed, Prelate of Huarí
José Eduardo Velásquez Tarazona (4 Feb 2004 – present)

Auxiliary bishops
Luigi Zanzottera, O.S.I. † (1969–1970)
José Eduardo Velásquez Tarazona (1994–2000), appointed Coadjutor Bishop of Tacna y Moquegua (later returned here as Bishop)

References

Roman Catholic dioceses in Peru
Roman Catholic Ecclesiastical Province of Trujillo
Religious organizations established in 1899
Roman Catholic dioceses and prelatures established in the 19th century